Goda Butkutė (born 10 July 1999) is a Lithuanian pair skater. With partner Nikita Ermolaev, she has won five senior international medals, including three on the ISU Challenger Series.

Personal life 
Goda Butkutė was born on 10 July 1999 in Kaunas, Lithuania.

Career 
Butkutė started skating in 2003. She was coached by Lilija Vanagienė in Lithuania. Around 2012, she began training in Saint Petersburg, Russia.

Partnership with Ermolaev 
Butkutė's partnership with Russian skater Nikita Ermolaev began in the 2012–13 season. They competed only in Lithuania and Russia during their first three seasons as a pair.

Representing Lithuania, Butkutė/Ermolaev appeared in their first International Skating Union competitions in the 2015–16 season. Konstantin Bezmaternykh coaches the pair in Saint Petersburg. They were awarded silver at their first event, the Lombardia Trophy in September 2015. In October, they won bronze at the 2015 Mordovian Ornament, their ISU Challenger Series (CS) debut. In November, the pair placed fourth at the 2015 CS Tallinn Trophy and took bronze at the 2015 CS Warsaw Cup.

In January 2016, Butkutė/Ermolaev placed 11th in both segments and overall at the European Championships in Bratislava. In March, they competed at the 2016 World Championships in Boston; ranked 17th in the short program, they missed qualifying for the free skate by one spot.

Programs 
(with Ermolaev)

Competitive highlights 
GP: Grand Prix; CS: Challenger Series

With Ermolaev

References

External links 
 

1999 births
Lithuanian female pair skaters
Living people
Sportspeople from Kaunas